College of Liberal Arts is the humanities and social sciences college at the University of Nevada. The Nevada School of the Arts and the School of Social Research and Justice Studies are located in the college. It was founded in 2004.

CLA contains fourteen departments and six programs and centers. More than half of all University of Nevada undergraduates enroll in CLA courses each semester. The College of Liberal Arts has over 200 full-time faculty and 44 support staff members.

Departments, programs and centers
Departments:
Anthropology
Art
Communication Studies
Criminal Justice
English
Gender, Race and Identity
History
Military Science
Music
Philosophy
Political Science
Sociology
Theatre and Dance
World languages and Literatures

Programs and centers:
Center for Basque Studies
Core Humanities Program
Grant Sawyer Center for Justice Studies
International Affairs Program
Latino Research Center
Oral History Program

External links

References 

2004 establishments in Nevada
Educational institutions established in 2004
Liberal arts colleges at universities in the United States
University of Nevada, Reno